Hagan is an unincorporated community in Lee County, Virginia, in the United States.

History
Hagan was named for Patrick Hagan, an original owner of the town site. A post office was established at Hagan in 1892, and remained in operation until it was discontinued in 1952.

References

Unincorporated communities in Lee County, Virginia
Unincorporated communities in Virginia